Won't You Come Around is an EP released by Australian folk rock musician Paul Kelly and his band on 3 November 2003 by EMI. The EP peaked at No. 55 on the Australian Recording Industry Association (ARIA) Australian Singles Charts. Kelly's nephew, Dan Kelly joins the Paul Kelly Band to share vocals, guitar and songwriting.

Background
The EP preceded the 2004 release of the double album, Ways and Means, from which the title track and "Little Bit O' Sugar" were taken. It also features a live performance covering Nick Cave and the Bad Seeds' "Nobody's Baby Now" and a cover of The Band's "Christmas Must Be Tonight" (from their 1977 album, Islands). "Emotional" was originally released on Kelly's website with the longer title "I Guess I Get a Little Emotional Sometimes". It is a political song about the plight of refugees who were imprisoned at Woomera. Kelly performed "Won't You Come Around" live on the SBS television musical quiz, RocKwiz before performing in a duet with Little Birdy's Katy Steele.

Track listing
All tracks written by Paul Kelly, except where noted.
 "Won't You Come Around" – 3:32
 "Emotional" – 5:03
 "Nobody's Baby Now" (live) (Nick Cave) – 4:50
 "Christmas Must Be Tonight" (Robbie Robertson) – 4:10
 "Little Bit O' Sugar" (Paul Kelly, Dan Kelly) – 6:03

Personnel
Paul Kelly Band members
 Steve Hadley – bass guitar
 Bruce Haymes – keyboards, organ (Hammond)
 Dan Kelly – guitar, vocals
 Paul Kelly – guitar, vocals
 Peter Luscombe – drums
 Bill McDonald – bass
 Shane O'Mara – guitar

Additional musicians
 Gerry Hale – fiddle
 Glen King – drums
 Richard Pleasance – vocals
 Russell Smith – trombone, trumpet
 Greg Walker – guitar, vocals, keyboards

Recording details
 Leah Baker – assistant 
 Tchad Blake – producer, engineer, mixing
 Alison Chains – design 
 Paul Grady – assistant  
 Paul Kelly – producer
 Richard Pleasance – producer, engineer, instrumentation
 Adam Rhodes – assistant
 Chris Thompson – engineer, mixing 
 Greg Walker – mixing, engineer, producer

Charts

References

2003 EPs
Paul Kelly (Australian musician) albums
Albums produced by Tchad Blake